Ultras is a 2020 Italian drama written and directed by Francesco Lettieri and starring Aniello Arena, Ciro Nacca and Simone Borrelli. The plot revolves around emerging violence by football fans in Naples, Italy.

It was released on 20 March 2020 on Netflix.

Cast
 Aniello Arena
 Ciro Nacca
 Simone Borrelli
 Daniele Vicorito
 Salvatore Pelliccia
 Antonia Truppo

Release
Ultras was released by Netflix on March 3, 2020.

External links

References

2020 films
Italian-language Netflix original films
2020s Italian-language films
Italian drama films
2020 drama films